Panserbasse is a 1936 Danish film directed by Lau Lauritzen Jr. and Alice O'Fredericks.

Cast
Knud Almar
Carl Carlsen
Victor Cornelius
Carl Fischer
Aage Fønss
Ingeborg Gandrup
Ellen Jansø
Arthur Jensen
Gunnar Lauring as Slubberten
Lau Lauritzen Jr.
Albert Luther
Karen Lykkehus
Connie Meiling as Lille Connie
Carl Viggo Meincke
Carola Merrild
Poul Reichhardt as Mekanikeren
Ib Schønberg as Gadebetjent Peter Basse
Lis Smed
Erika Voigt

References

External links

1936 films
1936 comedy films
1930s Danish-language films
Danish black-and-white films
Films directed by Lau Lauritzen Jr.
Films directed by Alice O'Fredericks
Danish comedy films